David Hampton (born May 7, 1947) is a former professional American football running back in the National Football League (NFL) for the Green Bay Packers, Atlanta Falcons, and Philadelphia Eagles.

College career
Hampton was part of a star-studded backfield which helped Wyoming post a  regular season record in 1967 and a number six national ranking. They played LSU in the Sugar Bowl and led after the first half, but lost  Other future pros in Wyoming's backfield that season included senior Jim Kiick, who was part of two Super Bowl championship teams with the Miami Dolphins, and Vic Washington, who helped the San Francisco 49ers win three consecutive NFC West division titles

Professional career
Hampton was selected by the Green Bay Packers in the ninth round of the 1969 NFL/AFL Draft in late  in what turned out to be general manager Vince Lombardi's last official function with the club before becoming coach and general manager of the Washington Redskins the  Hampton was expected to fill the shoes of retired legends Jim Taylor and Paul Hornung, but in three years with Green Bay, he, along with the rest of the Packers' aging offense, struggled.

His best success came with the Atlanta Falcons, where he was traded prior to the 1972 season. In his first year with the team, Hampton surpassed the 1,000-yard rushing yard mark during the Falcons' final game of the season against the Kansas City Chiefs. As part of a planned celebration for the Falcons' first 1,000-yard rushing season, the game was paused as Hampton was presented with a trophy and the game ball for his accomplishment. However, he was tackled for a six-yard loss on the following play and ended the season with 995 yards. In 1973, he had another chance to get a 1,000-yard rushing season, but he ended up three yards shy. After missing most of the 1974 season due to injury, he rushed for 1,002 yards in 1975 and received the NFL Comeback Player of the Year Award.

Hampton was traded from the Falcons to the Philadelphia Eagles for a 1978 tenth-round pick (257th overall–Ricky Patton) and cash on October 5, 1976. He had lost playing time to rookies Bubba Bean and Sonny Collins, but was going to a team needing running backs due to injuries.

References

External links
 

1947 births
Living people
Players of American football from Akron, Ohio
American football running backs
Wyoming Cowboys football players
Green Bay Packers players
Atlanta Falcons players
Philadelphia Eagles players